Báhoň is a village and municipality in western Slovakia in Pezinok District in the Bratislava Region. The village of roughly 1,650 people is located next to Kaplná, east of Pezinok and south-west of Trnava.

History
The first written reference to the town comes from 1244.  However, it is assumed that for the three hundred years before that Báhoň was owned by the Hungarian kings, attached to the Bratislava Castle estate.  In the middle of the 16th century the town has experienced an influx of German colonists, who soon became dominant.  Their dominance was defused half a century later when Croatian colonists moved in.  The town became fully Slovak after the 1918 founding of Czechoslovakia.

In 1580, the ruling Jazernický family built a mansion, which was expanded and rebuilt in 1759-1765.  The manor was rebuilt again in 1816 in Neoclassical style.  The final renovation came in 1935-1936.

In 1845, the horse railway that connected Trnava with Bratislava opened, with a stop in Báhoň.  This has positively impacted the town's social and industrial development.  After the regular rail line between Žilina and Bratislava opened, Báhoň retained its train station.

Between 1914 and 1921 the Roman Catholic church of Saint Francis of Assisi was built by the famous architect Milan Michal Harminc.  In 1930, the manor has become the home of a care home for the blind, and after World War II an electrical manufacturing facility customized for blind workers was opened.

Between 1974 and 1990, Báhoň was much larger than it is today, as it also included the villages of Kaplna and Igram.

Economy and Infrastructure
The village is best known for its vineyards.  It lies on the "Low Carpathian Mountains Vine Route", a tourist-oriented wine tasting route that connects all major wine producing towns in the region.

Báhoň has nine shops, five pubs and restaurants and multiple small businesses focusing primarily on basic materials processing, such as stone masoning, carpentry and metal smithing.

The town also has a medical center and a dentist, as well as a school and kindergarten.  In addition, it has a post office, public water and gas grid, and a sewage system connected to a sewage plant.  This level of infrastructure is considered well developed, compared to neighboring villages.

Culture and Entertainment
The local church features a boy choir. There is a library, and the Town Hall publishes a quarterly newsletter.

Báhoň also has a soccer team, which plays in Slovakia's lowest, Sixth Division soccer league.  In addition, there is a public pool, tennis courts and a Judo training class.

Demographics
As of 2004, Báhoň had 1,615 inhabitants: 821 males and 794 females. 96.2% were of Slovak ethnicity, 0.9% Hungarians, and the rest was spread among Czech, Gypsy, Ukrainian and German ethnicities.  89.6% of people were Roman Catholic, 1.5% Evangelical Catholic and 6.3% atheist. Of the 408 houses in the village 349 were permanently occupied.

Genealogical resources

The records for genealogical research are available at the state archive "Statny Archiv in Bratislava, Slovakia"

 Roman Catholic church records (births/marriages/deaths): 1703-1823, 1853-1901 (parish A)
 Lutheran church records (births/marriages/deaths): 1827-1896 (parish B), 1786-1895 (parish C)
 Census records 1869 of Bahon are not available at the state archive.

See also
 List of municipalities and towns in Slovakia

References

External links

Official home page (in Slovak)
Bahon Manor profile and pictures (in Slovak)
Picture of the Bahon train station
Surnames of living people in Bahon

Villages and municipalities in Pezinok District